Senna is a 2010 documentary film that depicts the life and death of Brazilian motor-racing champion Ayrton Senna, directed by Asif Kapadia. The film was produced by StudioCanal, Working Title Films, and Midfield Films, and was distributed by the parent company of the latter two production companies, Universal Pictures.

The film's narrative focuses on Senna's racing career in Formula One, from his debut in the 1984 Brazilian Grand Prix to his death in an accident at the 1994 San Marino Grand Prix, with particular emphasis on his rivalry with fellow driver Alain Prost. It relies primarily on archival racetrack footage and home video clips provided by the Senna family, rather than retrospective video interviews, and has no formal commentary.

Synopsis
The film begins with Senna's arrival into Formula One during the 1984 season, briefly covering his time at Toleman and Lotus before concentrating on his time with the British team McLaren – the association that brought his rise to global fame – and becoming a World Champion.  The drama of this period of his career centers on his rivalry with his team mate Alain Prost, and his political struggles with the then head of FISA Jean-Marie Balestre, climaxing during the 1989 and 1990 seasons, when Senna and Prost were involved in controversial clashes which decided the drivers' world championship title, in 1989 for Prost and in 1990 for Senna.

The film portrays the increasingly complex dynamics and tumult that characterized Senna's years as world champion, his battle to improve his sport's safety, and his reactions as he witnesses accidents and eventually the death of Austrian fellow-driver Roland Ratzenberger the day before his own.  We see and hear through Senna's point of view that innovative computerization led in these years to the technological domination of the Williams cars, with Prost joining Williams and, in a fallout with Senna, refusing to be on a team with Senna anymore. The documentary reaches its finale as Prost retires and Senna takes up a champion driver spot with Williams, the Grove-based team in 1994, just as Formula One rules change, disallowing computerization, and the Williams' cars undergo rapid reconfiguration that proves fatal.  In the culminating weekend of his life, at that year's San Marino Grand Prix, footage shows Senna under extreme stress, troubled as safety conditions reveal their weaknesses in one track accident after another over three consecutive days. Rubens Barrichello is injured in a crash during Friday qualifying, Ratzenberger is killed in an accident during final qualifying on 30 April, and at the start of the race JJ Lehto stalls and is hit at high speed by Pedro Lamy. The safety car is brought out, and when racing resumes, Senna crashes fatally on lap 7. The film concludes with the Senna family and his close friends from Formula One mourning his loss at his funeral.

Style
"Senna has no talking head interviews and no authoritative commentary". It is a collage of private home videos, public TV appearances, press conferences and races. "Like the pop art movement decades prior, Kapadia takes existing elements of mass culture and transforms and recontextualises them". Kapadia was able to "fashion Senna's story as a live action drama rather than a posthumous documentary." The film "delivers an unquestionably cinematic experience", negotiating "a diffuse line between reality and representation".

Release
A special screening of Senna was held on 7 October 2010 at the 2010 Japanese Grand Prix, at the Suzuka Circuit in Suzuka, Japan. The official world première was held at the Cinemark Theatre in Sao Paulo, Brazil on 3 November 2010. It was released in Brazil on 12 November 2010 and the UK on 3 June 2011.

Home media
In Japan and Brazil, the film was released on DVD and Blu-ray Disc on 21 and 24 March 2011, respectively. On 11 October it was released onto home media in the UK and was released on 6 March 2012 in the United States.

Two versions of the film were released, one in cinemas, DVD, Netflix, iTunes, and Blu-ray Disc. The other is only available in the United Kingdom in double-layered Blu-ray Disc, extending the length of the film to 162 minutes, with more interviews and insider information.

The film had a special limited box set edition, that provided the DVD of the film, a double-layered Blu-Ray Disc and a model of one of Senna's racing cars.

Reception

Critical response
Senna received critical acclaim from critics. On review aggregator website Rotten Tomatoes, the film holds an approval rating of 93% based on 122 reviews, and an average rating of 7.92/10. The website's critical consensus reads, "Even for filmgoers who aren't racing fans, Senna offers heart-pounding thrills -- and heartbreaking emotion." Dan Jolin of Empire Magazine gave the film 4 stars out of 5 and stated that it is "ambitiously constructed, deeply compelling, thrilling and in no way only for those who like watching cars drive in circles". Steve Rose, writing in The Guardian, also gave the film a 4 out of 5, and praised the fact that "with so much recorded footage of Formula One available, it has been possible to fashion Senna's story as a live action drama rather than a posthumous documentary. We're not so much hearing what happened in the past as seeing it happen before our eyes."

Alain Prost was highly critical of the film and its depiction of his relationship with Senna as he felt it did not adequately explore the way their relationship changed from rivals to friends in the final months of Senna's life. In an interview, Julian Jakobi, who was Senna and Prost's manager, explained that the movie understated the role of Honda in the relationship, namely, Prost was a McLaren man and Senna was a Honda man as they brought together to McLaren, and thus they had different power bases to get things done off the track.

Accolades

References

External links
 
 
 
 
 Official trailer

Ayrton Senna
2010 films
2010 documentary films
2010s sports films
British auto racing films
French auto racing films
French documentary films
Collage film
Documentary films about auto racing
Documentary films about sportspeople
Formula One mass media
Sundance Film Festival award winners
StudioCanal films
Working Title Films films
Universal Pictures films
Films directed by Asif Kapadia
Films produced by Tim Bevan
Films produced by Eric Fellner
BAFTA winners (films)
Films scored by Antônio Pinto
2010s English-language films
British sports documentary films
2010s British films
2010s French films